Dana Tuleyeva-Aketayeva ( Aketayeva, born 24 January 1986) is a Kazakhstani chess player who holds the FIDE titles of Woman International Master (WIM, 2003).

Biography
Three times Tuleyeva-Aketayeva represented Kazakhstan in World Girls' Junior Chess Championships (2004-2006) Seven times she has won Kazakhstan's Girls' Youth Chess Championships in different age groups. In 2005, she won Kazakhstani Women's Chess Championship and Women's World Chess Championship Asian Zonal tournament.

In 2006, she participated in Women's World Chess Championship by knock-out system and in the first round lost to Qin Kanying.

Tuleyeva-Aketayeva played for Kazakhstan in the Women's Chess Olympiads:
 In 2002, at third board in the 35th Chess Olympiad (women) in Bled (+8, =1, -5),
 In 2006, at first board in the 37th Chess Olympiad (women) in Turin (+3, =6, -4).

In 2003, she was awarded the FIDE Woman International Master (WIM) titles.

References

External links
 
 
 

1986 births
Living people
Kazakhstani female chess players
Chess Olympiad competitors
Chess Woman International Masters
Chess players at the 2006 Asian Games
Asian Games competitors for Kazakhstan
21st-century Kazakhstani women